Corymbia novoguinensis is a species of tree that is native to New Guinea, some Torres Strait Island and the Cape York Peninsula. It has rough bark on the trunk and branches, lance-shaped adult leaves, flower buds in groups of seven, creamy white flowers and urn-shaped to barrel-shaped fruit.

Description
It has rough, fissured, flaky or fibrous and tessellated bark on the trunk and branches. Flowering has been observed in August and the flowers are creamy white.

Corymbia novoguinensis is similar to C. clarksoniana, C. ligans and C. polycarpa, but is distinguished from them on the basis of fruit shape.

Taxonomy and naming
This eucalypt was first formally described in 1987 by Denis Carr and Stella Carr from specimens collected on Daru Island in Papua New Guinea, and was given the name Eucalyptus novoguinensis. In 1995 Ken Hill and Lawrie Johnson changed the name to Corymbia novoguinensis. The specific epithet (novoguinensis) is a reference to the type location.

Distribution and habitat
This species grows in coastal area of southern Papua New Guinea, south-eastern Irian Jaya, some Torres Strait Islands and the northern part of the Cape York Peninsula.

See also
 List of Corymbia species

References

novoguinensis
Myrtales of Australia
Flora of Queensland
Flora of New Guinea
Plants described in 1987
Taxa named by Maisie Carr